Celilo Canal was a canal connecting two points of the Columbia River between the states of Oregon and Washington, U.S. just east of The Dalles.

In the natural state of the Columbia River, there was an  stretch from The Dalles to Celilo Falls that was impassable upstream and navigable downstream only at high water and at great risk. Celilo Canal was built in the early part of the 1900s to allow steamboat and river-borne traffic to bypass that stretch.

History and construction 
In 1858, a -long wagon road, the Oregon Portage Railroad, had been built around the falls on the south side of the river. This was replaced in 1863 by a -long portage railway owned by the Oregon Steam Navigation Company. A number of studies and false starts were made towards building a canal around the falls, but construction on what was to become known as the Celilo Canal did not begin until 1905, and then took ten years to complete. In 1909, Scientific American summarized the status of the work and its objectives:

Scientific American was also optimistic about the prospective economic value of the canal:

The federal government spent 5 million dollars on its construction.  For an inaugural cruise, the steamer Undine left Portland April 29 and arrived in Lewiston, May 3, 1915.

Effect on navigation 
Boosters of the Celilo Canal organized the Open River Navigation Company, and put the Charles R. Spencer and J.N. Teal on the run from  Portland to The Dalles, Twin Cities and Inland Empire on the route up the Snake River, and Relief on the run from Celilo to Pasco, Washington.  Mountain Gem supported Relief above Celilo

Once the canal was complete, navigation was open on the Columbia from the mouth of the river all the way to Priest Rapids, and, up the Snake River, to the mouth of the Grande Ronde River near Rogersburg.  However, completion of the canal came too late to fend off competition from railroads, which had taken away most of the steamboat's business. Riverine transportation above Celilo never reached the hopes of the proponents of the canal.  Only in the late 1930s did the development of wheat barge traffic, eventually driven by diesel towboats, become an important transport method on the Columbia River.

Current state 
The canal and all related works were flooded following the completion of The Dalles Dam in 1957.

References

External links

Photographs 
Albany on the Big Eddy above The Dalles
Corps of Engineers photos of rapids and falls on the Columbia River between The Dalles and Celilo
Corps of Engineers map showing location of proposed Celilo Canal and locks
Celilo Canal and lock, 1915
Sternwheeler Umatilla in Celilo Canal
First steamboats to pass through Celilo canal, Inland Empire and J.M. Teal

History of transportation in Oregon
Columbia River
1915 establishments in Oregon
Canals in Washington (state)